The Trio Men event was held on July 25.

Results

References

Trio Men
2009 in gymnastics